Justin Pipe (born 9 November 1971) is an English former professional darts player who has played in the Professional Darts Corporation (PDC) events. He was a former top 10 player.

Playing career
Pipe was a boxer in his youth, and, as a staunch anti-smoker, he refused to play darts in local pubs as the cigarette smoke would make his eyes water. In 2007, a smoking ban was introduced to England which enabled him to restart his darts career. He first emerged at the 2008 UK Open as a pub qualifier. He defeated Geoff Wylie and Lionel Sams before losing 9–3 to James Wade in the third round. Following this performance, he joined the PDC Pro Tour and reached the same stage of the UK Open a year later, this time losing 9–5 against Andy Jenkins.

He qualified for the 2010 Grand Slam of Darts as one of four ITV Wildcard qualifiers. He lost all three of his group games to James Wade, Vincent van der Voort, and Tony O'Shea.

2011–2014 
Pipe also qualified for the 2011 PDC World Darts Championship, losing 1–3 in the first round to Mark Walsh. In June 2011, Pipe hit a nine-dart finish in a Players Championship match in Nuland against Colin Osborne. Pipe made his World Matchplay debut in 2011. He defeated Mervyn King 10–6 in the first round.
In October, Pipe won his first PDC Pro Tour event in Dublin, defeating Phil Taylor 6–5 in the final. On 5 November, Pipe won his third Players Championship in just a month.

Pipe qualified for the 2011 Grand Slam of Darts. He beat Terry Jenkins 5–1 in the first match of the group stage, then missed a dart at a double to beat James Wade. In his final match against Dave Chisnall, Pipe had a shot at 17 in the deciding leg to qualify but bust with his first dart and lost the match, and was eventually eliminated as Jenkins beat Wade in the final match.
At the 2011 Players Championship Finals, Pipe was the number 1 seed as he had reached the final of six of the last ten events. He reached the second round where he missed six match darts against Mark Webster before losing 8–7.

Pipe won his first ever match at the PDC World Championship in 2012 by beating Sean Reed 3–1. In the second round he came from 2–0 down against world number 7 Wes Newton, to win 4–3 and reach the last 16, where he played Terry Jenkins. Pipe came up against an inspired opponent, who averaged 102, and lost the match 1–4.

Pipe saw his progress in 2011 rewarded at the annual PDC awards ceremony on 3 January 2012, as he picked up the PDPA Players' Player of the Year award. He then continued his fine form by winning the first Players Championship of 2012 with a 6–0 whitewash of Paul Nicholson in the Spanish Darts Trophy. He almost pulled off a remarkable double as he reached the final of the second event a day later, but was beaten by Michael Smith 3–6. In April, Pipe won the Austrian Darts Open with a 6–3 victory over James Wade in the final, having defeated Raymond van Barneveld in the semi-finals by the same scoreline with a 107 average. The victory saw him rise into the world's top 16 for the very first time, as he was ranked 15, meaning he gained automatic qualification into the upcoming major events. Pipe lost to Dave Chisnall 4–6 in the final of the sixth Players Championship event in May, having earlier beaten the likes of Kevin Painter, Simon Whitlock and Raymond van Barneveld.

In the World Matchplay Pipe beat Joe Cullen and Wes Newton, but then lost to Ronnie Baxter 11–16 in his first televised quarter-final. At the World Grand Prix, Pipe came through close matches against Whitlock and Painter, but was then beaten 1–3 by home favourite Brendan Dolan in the quarter-finals in the double to start event. Pipe qualified from Group 2 of the Championship League with a 6–5 victory against Phil Taylor. He finished 5th in the Winners Group, as he won three of his seven league matches, only missing out on the play-offs by leg difference. After all 33 ProTour events of 2012 had been played, Pipe finished fifth on the Order of Merit to qualify for the Players Championship Finals. It was there that Pipe reached his first major televised semi-final as he saw off Colin Osborne, Brendan Dolan and Mervyn King. Pipe went 0–2 down to Kim Huybrechts in the semi-final and never restored parity in the match as he lost 6–11.

Pipe was defeated in the second round of the 2013 World Championship 2–4 by Mark Walsh, after overcoming Andy Jenkins 3–0 in the first. After being a losing quarter-finalist in three events during the first half of 2013, Pipe reached the semi-finals for the first time this year at the third Players Championship, but lost 3–6 to Paul Nicholson. He suffered a surprise 2–5 defeat to Gareth Pass in the first round of the UK Open. At the World Matchplay, he beat Mark Webster 10–4 in the first round and then defeated Raymond van Barneveld 13–9 with a 170 checkout. In his second consecutive quarter-final in the event, Pipe lost 10–16 to Phil Taylor. Pipe beat Andy Smith 2–0 and Adrian Lewis 3–0 in the opening rounds of the World Grand Prix and then saw off Andy Hamilton to reach his second major semi-final in a performance Pipe claimed was the best of his career. He faced Dave Chisnall and started the better as he led 1–0 and 2–1 but could only win another two legs in the match as Chisnall's scoring power eventually told in a 5–2 defeat. Pipe won through to the semi-finals of the Players Championship Finals for the second successive year where he faced Phil Taylor. He kept pace early on but with the match on throw at 5–4, Taylor took out a 132 finish on the bull with Pipe on 38, to enter the second break 6–4 ahead, before going on to defeat Pipe 10–4.

2014–2022
Pipe was beaten by qualifier Devon Petersen 4–1 in the second round of the 2014 World Championship. He reached the final of the first European Tour event of the year, the German Darts Championship, and led Gary Anderson 5–3 but missed six darts for the match to lose 6–5. Pipe lost 9–7 to Dave Chisnall in the third round of the UK Open. In May, he was beaten 6–2 by Peter Wright in the final of the ninth Players Championship. Pipe won his first title in over two years at the 15th Players Championship of 2014. In the semi-finals and final he won deciding legs over world number three Adrian Lewis and reigning world champion Michael van Gerwen respectively. However, two days later he was beaten 2–0 (sets) by Robert Thornton in the opening round of the World Grand Prix. Pipe reached the quarter-finals of the Masters by beating Peter Wright 10–7 and lost 10–6 to Mervyn King.

At the 2015 World Championship, Pipe led Australian qualifier Laurence Ryder 2–1 in the first round but then lost six consecutive legs to suffer a surprise 3–2 defeat. He was knocked out in the third round of the UK Open for the second year in a row, this time 9–5 by Jan Dekker. Pipe's first final of the year came at the Dutch Darts Masters in June which he reached without facing a single top 20 player, but he was whitewashed 6–0 by Michael van Gerwen. He lost 10–7 in the first round of the World Matchplay to Jamie Lewis and 3–0 in sets to Robert Thornton in the second round of the 2015 World Grand Prix. After failing to get past the second round of the last two majors he played in 2015, it meant that Pipe has not reached the quarter-finals of a major event in over two years.

Pipe couldn't advance beyond the first round of the World Championship for the second year in a row, as he was beaten 3–0 by Christian Kist whilst averaging 75.55, losing the final seven legs of the match. He lost 9–3 to Kim Huybrechts in the fourth round of the UK Open and 10–7 to Terry Jenkins in the first round of the World Matchplay. His only semi-final of the year came at the final Players Championship event by beating Peter Wright 6–5, but he was ousted 6–5 by Benito van de Pas. Pipe missed match darts in the opening round of the European Championship to be edged out 6–5 by Wright. He got to the third round of the Players Championship Finals by eliminating Andy Jenkins 6–3 and Jan Dekker 6–1, but lost 10–6 to Kist.

Pipe lost 3–1 to Chris Dobey in the first round of the 2017 World Championship. Pipe was the 23rd seed in the 2017 Players Championship Finals. He beat Daryl Gurney 10–9 in the quarterfinal before losing 11–3 to Michael van Gerwen in the semifinal.

Pipe faced Bernie Smith in the first round of the 2018 World Championship. He won the match 3–2 after a tiebreaker in controversial circumstances after he appeared to move closer to Smith, who was throwing for the match, and cough causing his opponent to miss. The event was dubbed "Cough-gate". Pipe faced Phil Taylor in the second round and won only two legs in a 4–0 defeat.

On 8 January 2018, Pipe was fined £3,000 by the Darts Regulation Authority in relation to the above incident.

2022
He lost his tour card and it has been announced that he will not return for the 2022 PDC Q School.

Playing style
His slow throwing style is partly attributed to a serious car accident he suffered in 1993, where his right arm was paralysed for three months.

Management and sponsorship
Pipe joined darts manufacturer Cosmo Darts as a sponsored player on 14 October 2011.

Since January 2015, Pipe is self-managed by his 'Team Pipe' made up of family members and friend Krispy Brown.

Personal life
Pipe is married to Claire and they have two sons and a daughter. His brother, Mark, died in June 2013. Pipe played the following weekend in the European Championship and dedicated his first round win to him. Pipe has suffered from a persistent cough since childhood which at times has affected his and his opponent's game.

He worked as an arborist before becoming a professional darts player in 2010.

World Championship results

PDC
 2011: First round (lost to Mark Walsh 1–3)
 2012: Third round (lost to Terry Jenkins 1–4)
 2013: Second round (lost to Mark Walsh 2–4)
 2014: Second round (lost to Devon Petersen 1–4)
 2015: First round (lost to Laurence Ryder 2–3)
 2016: First round (lost to Christian Kist 0–3)
 2017: First round (lost to Chris Dobey 1–3)
 2018: Second round (lost to Phil Taylor 0–4)
 2020: Second round (lost to Daryl Gurney 0–3)

Performance timeline

References

External links

1971 births
Living people
English darts players
Professional Darts Corporation former tour card holders
Sportspeople from Taunton
PDC ranking title winners